Terrou (Languedocien: Terron) is a commune in the Lot department in south-western France.

See also
 Communes of the Lot department

References

Communes of Lot (department)
Lot communes articles needing translation from French Wikipedia